Santa Margherita di Staffora is a comune (municipality) in the Province of Pavia in the Italian region Lombardy, located about 80 km south of Milan and about 50 km south of Pavia. As of 31 December 2004, it had a population of 589 and an area of 36.7 km².

Santa Margherita di Staffora borders the following municipalities: Bobbio, Brallo di Pregola, Fabbrica Curone, Menconico, Varzi, Zerba.

Demographic evolution

References

Cities and towns in Lombardy